Common hovea is a common name for several plants native to Australia and may refer to:

Hovea linearis
Hovea trisperma, endemic to Western Australia